Malcolm Slaney is an American electrical engineer, whose research has focused on machine perception and multimedia analysis. He is a Fellow of the IEEE for "contributions to perceptual signal processing and tomographic imaging". He is a consulting professor at the Stanford University Center for Computer Research in Music and Acoustics and an affiliate faculty member in the Electrical Engineering Department at the University of Washington. 

Slaney attended Purdue University for his bachelor's, master's, and PhD degrees in electrical engineering. He is currently a Research Scientist in the Machine Hearing group at Google. Previously, he worked at Bell Labs, Schlumberger Palo Alto Research, Apple Computer, Interval Research Corporation, IBM Research – Almaden, Yahoo! Research, and Microsoft Research.

Slaney's 1988 book with Avinash Kak, Principles of Computerized Tomographic Imaging, which he co-wrote as a grad student, has been selected by the Society for Industrial and Applied Mathematics for republication in their Classics in Applied Mathematics series.

References

Living people
Fellow Members of the IEEE
Purdue University College of Engineering alumni
Stanford University Department of Music faculty
University of Washington faculty
Scientists at Bell Labs
Apple Inc. employees
IBM employees
Yahoo! employees
Microsoft employees
Google employees
American electrical engineers
Year of birth missing (living people)